Harden–Murrumburrah is a township and community in the Hilltops Region and is located in the South West Slopes of New South Wales in Australia. Harden is adjacent to both the Canberra region of the Australian Capital Territory and the Riverina Region in the southwest area of NSW. The town is a twin town between Harden and Murrumburrah (which is noted as one of the earliest settlements in the southwest of New South Wales).

The town is traversed by the Burley Griffin Way, the major link from and between the Riverina and the Hume Highway near Yass, and ultimately Sydney, Canberra and the coast. Cunningham Creek runs along the edge of the town.

The Olympic Highway traverses the western end of the shire and is the major link through the central west to the Blue Mountains and from there to the Sydney region.

Harden is 3½ hours away by road from Sydney, and 1½ hours from Canberra and Wagga Wagga.

History
Before European settlement the Harden area was inhabited by the Wiradjuri people. Hume and Hovell passed nearby in 1824. In the late 1820s, the 'Murrumburra' was established. Its superintendent, James Kennedy, established an inn on the townsite in the late 1840s. Gold was found in the area in the 1850s.

Harden railway station was opened one km east of Murrumburrah on the Main Southern line in 1877 as Murrumburrah, but changed its name to Harden a year after the opening of a new station in Murrumburrah in 1879. Harden has remained as the main station and, as a result, became the main town.

A post office at Harden was opened on 1 January 1870, and in 1926 £2000 of funding was secured to provide extensive improvements to the aging facility.

The first Australian Lighthorse was also founded in Harden–Murrumburrah, with the Lighthorse festival occurring annually.

From 1906 until 2016 Harden–Murrumburrah was the seat of its own local council, but was amalgamated in 2016 to form Hilltops Council.
The town's rugby league team competed for the Maher Cup, and continue to compete in senior football today in the George Tooke Shield.

Harden is also home to Murrumburrah High School, which was established in 1977 and is currently the only secondary education facility for the town.

Facilities 
Harden boasts a variety of facilities servicing residents from both Harden, Murrumburrah and surrounds.

 Harden-Murrumburrah & District War Memorial Pool; containing a 50-metre Olympic swimming pool as well as two smaller wading pools.
 Harden Post Office
 Hilltops Council Library Harden Branch located inside the Trinity Centre.
 Kruger Medical Centre, a healthcare facility with General Practitioners providing healthcare for chronic disease management, as well as family medicine, womens health and mental health. 
 Murrumburrah High School; a secondary education facility. 
 Murrumburrah-Harden Health Service, a small hospital facility with 33 beds including 13 hospital care beds and 20 residential aged care beds. The facility sits under the Murrumbidgee Local Health District.

Climate 
Harden experiences a humid subtropical climate (Köppen: Cfa, Trewartha: Cfbl/Cfal) with warm summers and cool winters.

Heritage listings 
Harden has a number of heritage-listed sites, including:
 Main Southern railway: Harden railway station

Population
According to the 2016 census of population, there were 2,030 people in Harden. At the 2021 census, this had dropped to 1,900 people.
 Aboriginal and Torres Strait Islander people made up 8.7% of the population.
  84.6% of people were born in Australia and 90.7% of people only spoke English at home.
 The most common responses for religion were Catholic 31.3%, No Religion 24.9% and Anglican 24.6%.

Transport
The Main Southern railway line passes through Harden. It became an important railway town with the line to Blayney branching off a few kilometres beyond Harden at Demondrille. Harden railway station is served by two daily NSW TrainLink XPT services between Melbourne and Sydney in each direction and the twice weekly Xplorer service between Griffith and Sydney. 
NSW TrainLink trial road coach services 703 and 704 between Wagga Wagga and Canberra via Cootamundra pass through Harden, but as at September 2019 do not pick up or drop off passengers there. 
Busabout Wagga Wagga have a depot in the town.

Gallery

See also 
 List of reduplicated Australian place names

Notes

External links 

 Hilltops Council
 Hilltops Region Visitor Information
 Harden-Murrumburrah Website (Archived)

 
Towns in New South Wales
Harden Shire
Hilltops Council
Mining towns in New South Wales